Musthaffaa is a 1996 Tamil language action drama film directed by R. Aravindraj. The film stars Napoleon and Ranjitha, with Goundamani, Mansoor Ali Khan, K. Prasanna, Lakshmi, Kazan Khan, Alex, Sooriya, Rajeshkumar, Babloo Prithiveeraj, Ganeshkar and Charmila playing supporting roles. It was released on 16 February 1996. The film was later remade into Hindi as Ghulam-E-Mustafa (1997) starring Nana Patekar and Raveena Tandon and into Bangladeshi Bengali as Abbajan (2001) starring Manna and Sathi and in Bengali as Rehmat Ali (2010) starring Mithun Chakraborty and Rituparna Sengupta.

Plot
Musthaffaa is the trusted henchman of the godfather Periyavar. When politicians need help, they notify Periyavar, and Musthaffaa, in turn, solves the problem with his sidekick Chellappa. Musthaffaa considers Periyavar as his own father and he calls him Vappa (father in Tamil Muslim) whilst he considers Chellappa as his own elder brother.

In the meantime, Sundaresan is appointed as an office worker in a government office, and he has persistently refused bribes. Being from a middle-class orthodox Brahmin family, Sundaresan lives with his sick wife Bhagyalakshmi, his daughter Lalitha, and his son Ramkumar. Lalitha falls in love with Lakshmanan, while Ramkumar wants to become an engineer. Lakshmanan's family ask for a huge dowry for the wedding, and the principal of the engineering college asks them for a huge amount to enrol their son. Without enough revenue, they refuse both proposals. When Musthaffaa learns of their problem, he pressures Sundaresan to sign some contracts without examining them in exchange for bribes, but they still refuse.

Musthaffaa shares enmity with Kaalaiya who wants to kill Periyavar. Meanwhile, a dancer named Kavita, who works in Kaalaiya's dance club, is saved by Musthaffaa from Kaalaiya's henchmen. With the help of Musthaffaa, Kavita becomes a Bharata Natyam teacher. Kavita develops a soft corner for Musthaffaa, and they finally decide to marry. In the meantime, Bhagyalakshmi's asthma has worsened and she is hospitalised. To treat her, Sundaresan must disburse a huge amount. The next day, the vigilance officer Rajaram, dressed as a civilian, tries to corrupt the officers, but only Sundaresan accepts. Sundaresan is subsequently arrested for corruption.

Kaalaiya plans to kill Periyavar, so his son puts a bomb in his car. Unfortunately, Kavita is killed in the car blast before their wedding. Thereafter, Musthaffaa turns berserk and kills Kaalaiya's son. Musthaffaa decides to become a good man, so he helps Sundaresan's family and decides to live with them. Thereby, Periyavar becomes upset over Musthaffaa's decision. First, the relationship between Musthaffaa and Sundaresan's family was tense, but later they lived together harmoniously.

During the Legislative Assembly election, the violence is in full swing between the ruling party and the opposition party. Periyavar, on the side of the ruling party, cannot control it without Musthaffaa while Kaalaiya, on the side of the opposition party, is gaining in power with Rajaram's aid. So Musthaffaa decides to take this last job to finance Lalitha's wedding and Ramkumar's education, to give again Sundaresan's job, and to treat Bhagyalakshmi's asthma. Finally, Musthaffaa kills Kaalaiya, and the ruling party wins the election. Minister Sathyanathan congrats him for his work; as for Musthaffaa, he requests the minister to deal with the problems peacefully, but it does not please Sathyanathan. During Lalitha's wedding, Musthaffaa is arrested by the police, but as a transformed person, he accepts the sentence. There, in a twist of fate, Periyavar's henchman shoots Musthaffaa in the back, and he died in Periyavar's arms. Periyavar orders to kill him because of fear of reprisal and self-interest. In turn, Chellappa murders Periyavar and is arrested.

Cast

Napoleon as Musthaffaa
Ranjitha as Kavitha
Goundamani as Chellappa
Mansoor Ali Khan as Kaalaiya
K. Prasanna as Sundaresan
Lakshmi as Bhagyalakshmi
Charmila as Lalitha
Ganeshkar as Ramkumar
Kazan Khan as Rajaram
Alex as Kaalaiya's henchman
Soorya as Periyavar
Rajeshkumar as Kaalaiya's son
Babloo Prithiveeraj as Lakshmanan
Suryakanth as Periyavar's henchman
Kumarimuthu as Government worker
Prathapachandran as Sathyanathan
T. S. Raghavendra as Lakshmanan's father
P. R. Varalakshmi as Lakshmanan's mother
Vaithi
Swaminathan as Government worker
Janaki as Kavitha's mother
Murali Kumar as Government worker
Mythili
Jayamani

Soundtrack

The film score and the soundtrack were composed by Vidyasagar. The soundtrack, released in 1996, features 5 tracks with lyrics written by Vairamuthu.

Production
K. Prasanna had written Musthaffaa as a serial in the weekly magazine Ananda Vikatan and had also staged it as a drama. Impressed by the story, the producer P. G. Shrikanth decides to make into a film. The experienced director R. Aravindraj, who directed cult films such as Oomai Vizhigal and Uzhavan Magan, was selected to direct the film while Vidyasagar composed the musical score. Napoleon accepted to play the title role. Napoleon has acted in P. G. Shrikanth's previous venture Seevalaperi Pandi which was a blockbuster and was a turning point in his career.

Reception
K. Vijayan of New Straits Times praised the actor Napoleon and said, "whatever inadequacies Musthaffaa had in the first half is redeemed in the second half". A critic from Indolink gave the film two stars out of four.

Remakes

References

1996 films
1990s Tamil-language films
Indian action drama films
Tamil films remade in other languages
Films scored by Vidyasagar
Indian gangster films
Films directed by R. Aravindraj
1996 action films